Ewing is a village in Franklin County, Illinois, United States. The population was 307 at the 2010 census.

Geography
Ewing is located in northern Franklin County at  (38.089998, -88.853674).

Demographics

As of the census of 2000, there were 310 people, 121 households, and 86 families residing in the village. The racial makeup of the village was 100.00% White. Hispanic or Latino of any race were 1.29% of the population.

There were 121 households, out of which 38.0% had children under the age of 18 living with them, 57.9% were married couples living together, 10.7% had a female householder with no husband present, and 28.1% were non-families. 26.4% of all households were made up of individuals, and 14.9% had someone living alone who was 65 years of age or older.  The average household size was 2.56 and the average family size was 3.10.

In the village, the population was spread out, with 28.1% under the age of 18, 6.5% from 18 to 24, 26.8% from 25 to 44, 25.2% from 45 to 64, and 13.5% who were 65 years of age or older.  The median age was 38 years. For every 100 females, there were 87.9 males.  For every 100 females age 18 and over, there were 85.8 males.

The median income for a household in the village was $31,000, and the median income for a family was $41,042. Males had a median income of $36,250 versus $19,821 for females. The per capita income for the village was $14,917.  About 6.8% of families and 9.3% of the population were below the poverty line, including 16.3% of those under the age of eighteen and none of those 65 or over.

References

External links
"The Town a College Created", article on the history of Ewing from Illinois History magazine, Illinois Periodicals Online (a project of the Northern Illinois University Libraries and the Illinois State Library)
An article about the history of Ewing College.

Villages in Franklin County, Illinois
Villages in Illinois
Populated places in Southern Illinois